Marines in the Making is a 1942 short propaganda film produced by Metro-Goldwyn-Mayer about the United States Marine Corps. It was nominated for an Academy Award for Best Short Subject, One-reel in 1943.

See also 
 List of Allied propaganda films of World War II

References

External links 
 
 

1942 films
1942 short films
1940s war films
American short films
American World War II propaganda shorts
American black-and-white films
Films about the United States Marine Corps
American war films
1940s English-language films
1940s American films